WMXB (1280 AM, "Mix 107.3") is a radio station licensed to serve Eutaw, Alabama, United States.  The station is owned by Jim Lawson Communications, Inc., and the broadcast license is held by Lawson of Tuscaloosa, Inc. WMXB airs an urban adult contemporary music format.

The station was assigned the WMXB call letters by the Federal Communications Commission on May 11, 2010.

On December 15, 2005, the station was granted a construction permit to relocate to Eutaw, Alabama, and increase its broadcast power to 7,000 watts during the day and lower its night power to 25 watts. This permit expired on December 15, 2008.

On June 1, 2010, WMXB changed the format from gospel to urban adult contemporary, branded as "Mix 96.9".

In January 2015, WMXB rebranded as "Mix 107.3", switching to FM translator W297BJ 107.3 FM Tuscaloosa.

References

External links
Mix 107.3 Twitter

MXB
Urban adult contemporary radio stations in the United States
Radio stations established in 1951
1951 establishments in Alabama